Corinto (the Italian, Portuguese and Spanish-language name of the Greek city of Corinth) may refer to any of the following:

Brazil
Corinto, Minas Gerais
Colombia
Corinto, Cauca
El Salvador
Corinto, Morazán
Honduras
Corinto, Honduras
Nicaragua
Corinto, Nicaragua

Other uses
Corinto bianco, another name for the Spanish wine grape Pedro Ximénez